KJST-LD (virtual channel 28, digital channel 11) is a low-power television station in McAllen, Texas, broadcasting programming in Spanish under the Telefrontera brand.

KJST-LD programming can also be seen in Rio Grande City on KRGT-LP channel 6.

The station is owned by CTV Broadcasting, a local broadcaster not associated with Canada's CTV television network.

Technical information

Subchannels
The station's digital signal is multiplexed:

References

External links
Telefrontera

JST-LD
Television channels and stations established in 1999
1999 establishments in Texas
Low-power television stations in the United States